The Women's Defensive Player of the Year is an award for the top-tier women' basketball league in Iceland, the Úrvalsdeild kvenna.

All-time award winners
The following is a list of the all-time Úrvalsdeild Women's Defensive Player of the Year winners.

References

External links
Icelandic Basketball Federation Official Website 

Úrvalsdeild kvenna (basketball)
European basketball awards
Icelandic awards